Dirty Bailarina is the fourth studio album by Spanish hip hop singer La Mala Rodriguez.

Critical reception

Dirty Bailarina received excellent reviews in the media and is one of the most successful releases in the career of La Mala Rodriguez, getting 2 nominations at the 2010 Latin Grammy Awards for Best Urban Album and winning Best Urban Song for the first single "No Pidas Perdón". The album was largely produced in Atlanta by Focus... producer of singers as Christina Aguilera, Jennifer Lopez and Eminem. Her first single was "No Pidas Perdón" a pop-rap song that went Top 30 in Spain. Her second single was "Un Corazón", the video was released on September 28 through VEVO account on YouTube.

Track listing

Chart performance

References

2010 albums
Mala Rodríguez albums